Anguilla competed in the 2010 Commonwealth Games held in Delhi, India, from 3 to 14 October 2010.

Anguilla was represented by 12 athletes, competing in athletics and cycling.

Athletics

Men
Track

Cycling

Road

Men

See also
2010 Commonwealth Games

References

External links
  

Nations at the 2010 Commonwealth Games
Anguilla at the Commonwealth Games
2010 in Anguilla